The Peugeot Type 7 was built on the same chassis as the Peugeot Type 6 and shared some mechanicals but its engine was twice the size, and twice as powerful. It had a phaeton style body for 4 persons.  25 units were built between 1894 and 1897. The engine was carried over to the Type 8.

Description
The 1,282 cc V-twin Daimler engine was mounted at the back, and produced 3.7 hp. The cooling radiator was mounted at the front of the vehicle and the coolant flowed within the chassis tubing. Transmission was via a cone clutch, 4 speed gearbox and chains propelling the rear wheels. Some models had steel wire wheels with rubber tyres and others had wooden wheels. The weight was circa 650 kg and top speed was 18-20 km/h.

Competition
In 1894 Peugeot entered the 'Le Petit Journal' Competition for Horseless Carriages that ran from  Paris to Rouen with several Type 5's and 7s. Albert Lemaître's Type 7 Phaeton was the first petrol powered vehicle to finish, 3 minutes behind Jules-Albert, Comte de Dion on his steam powered tractor.
 
In 1895, a Peugeot Type 7 driven by Paul Koechlin with Rubichon as a mechanic, won the Paris–Bordeaux–Paris race.

References

1890s cars
Type 7
Rear-engined vehicles
Vehicles introduced in 1894